Małgorzata Maria Bartyzel (12 November 1955 – 23 July 2016) was a Polish politician. She was elected to Sejm on 25 September 2005, getting 8,333 votes in 9 Łódź district as a candidate from the Law and Justice list.

See also
Members of Polish Sejm 2005-2007

References

External links
Małgorzata Maria Bartyzel - parliamentary page - includes declarations of interest, voting record, and transcripts of speeches.

1955 births
2016 deaths
Politicians from Łódź
Members of the Polish Sejm 2005–2007
Women members of the Sejm of the Republic of Poland
Law and Justice politicians
Solidarity (Polish trade union) activists
Councillors in Łódź
Right Wing of the Republic politicians
21st-century Polish women politicians